Cirsium mexicanum is a Mesoamerican and Caribbean species of plants in the tribe Cardueae within the family Asteraceae. Common name is Mexican thistle. It is widespread across Mexico (Tamaulipas, Durango, Jalisco, Puebla, Hidalgo, Veracruz, Tabasco, Oaxaca, Chiapas, Yucatán Peninsula), Central America (all 7 countries) and the West Indies (Cuba, Hispaniola, Puerto Rico).

References

Czech Botany, pcháč / pichliač, Cirsium mexicanum  photos with captions in Czech

mexicanum
Flora of Mexico
Flora of Central America
Flora of the Caribbean
Plants described in 1753
Taxa named by Carl Linnaeus
Flora without expected TNC conservation status